Petro Nakonechnyi (Ukrainian: Петро Наконечний, born 1982) is a Ukrainian welterweight Muay Thai kickboxer, fighting out of the Captain Odessa gym in Odessa. He is the K-1 MAX Ukraine 2006 and K-1 Europe MAX 2008 in Poland Champion.

Biography and career
After making his name by winning numerous national and world Muay Thai titles, Nakonechnyi entered the K-1 promotion at K-1 East Europe MAX 2006 in March 2006 in Lithuania, where he defeated Belarusian fighter Vasily Shish. On November 24, 2006, he entered the 8-man Grand Prix at K-1 MAX Ukraine 2006 and won the tournament by defeating Dmitry Konstantinov, Aleksander Medvedev and Artem Sheglov.

In March the following year, he was invited to take part in the Grand Prix at K-1 East Europe MAX 2007 in Ukraine but was eliminated by Jurij Boreiko in the quarter-finals. He bounced back at K-1 Europe MAX 2008 in Poland in April 2008, however, as he advanced past Andrei Buda and Yury Harbachiov before defeating Michał Głogowski in the tournament final.

Titles
 2008 Busan TAFISA World Games IFMA Amateur Muay Thai 71 kg Gold medal
 2008 K-1 Europe MAX in Poland tournament champion
 2007 IFMA World Muay Thai Championships Bronze medal -75 kg
 2007 Ukrainian Muay Thai champion (-75 kg)
 2006 IFMA World Muay Thai Championships Silver medal -75 kg
 2006 K-1 Ukraine MAX tournament champion
 2005 10th Muay Thai National Championship of Ukraine champion (71 kg)
 2004 IFMA World Muay Thai Championships Bronze medal -71 kg
 2003 IFMA World Muay Thai Championships Silver medal 67 kg

Kickboxing record

|-
|
|Win
| Martin Gaňo
|Heroes Gate 15
|Prague, Czech Republic
| TKO (spinning back kick)
|align="center"|4
|align="center"|-
| 
|-
|
|Win
| Miroslav Smolar
|MČR K-1, European Cup WAKO
|Prague, Czech Republic
| Decision
|align="center"|3
|align="center"|3:00
| Win 2015 Czech K-1 Champion -71 kg
|-
|
|Win
| Gor Harutjunjan
|MČR K-1, European Cup WAKO
|Prague, Czech Republic
| Decision
|align="center"|3
|align="center"|3:00
| K-1 Czech 2015 Semi-Final
|-
|
|Win
| Radek Veřmířovský
|MČR K-1, European Cup WAKO
|Prague, Czech Republic
| KO
|align="center"|-
|align="center"|-
|K-1 Czech 2015 Quarter-Final
|-
|
|Win
| Pavol Garaj
|Simply The Best 4
|Prague, Czech Republic
| Decision
|align="center"|3
|align="center"|3:00
| 
|-
|
|Win
| Michal Krčmář
|Night of Warriors 7
|Liberec, Czech Republic
| Decision
|align="center"|3
|align="center"|3:00
| 
|-
|
|Win
| Marko Adamovič
|Night of Warriors 6
|Liberec, Czech Republic
| Decision
|align="center"|3
|align="center"|3:00
| 
|-
|
|Loss
| Vitaly Gurkov
|I.F.M.A. World Championships 2009, Semi Finals -71 kg
|Bangkok, Thailand
|Decision
|align="center"|4
|align="center"|2:00
| 
|-
|
|Loss
| Vitaly Gurkov
|"The Contender Asia" Season 2 Russia Super 8 Qualifier, Semi Finals
|Chelyabinsk, Russia
|Decision (unanimous)
|align="center"|3
|align="center"|3:00
| 
|-
|
|Win
| Vitaly Gurkov
|4th Busan TAFISA World Games, Final -71 kg
|Busan, South Korea
| -
|align="center"|-
|align="center"|-
|Wins 2008 I.F.M.A. World Championship Gold Medal -71 kg.
|-
|
|Win
| Marcus Öberg
|4th Busan TAFISA World Games
|Busan, South Korea
|Decision (unanimous)
|align="center"|4
|align="center"|2:00
| 
|-
|
|Win
| Michał Głogowski
|K-1 Europe MAX 2008 in Poland
|Warsaw, Poland
|Decision (unanimous)
|align="center"|3
|align="center"|3:00
|2008 Poland Grand Prix final.
|-
|
|Win
| Yury Harbachiov
|K-1 Europe MAX 2008 in Poland
|Warsaw, Poland
|KO (spinning back kick)
|align="center"|2
|align="center"|0:27
|2008 Poland Grand Prix semi-final.
|-
|
|Win
| Andrei Buda
|K-1 Europe MAX 2008 in Poland
|Warsaw, Poland
|Decision (unanimous)
|align="center"|3
|align="center"|3:00
|2008 Poland Grand Prix quarter-final.
|-
|
|Loss
| Artem Levin
|WMC IFMA World Muaythai Championships
|Bangkok, Thailand
|Decision
|align="center"|4
|align="center"|3:00
| 
|-
|
|Loss
| Jurij Boreiko
|K-1 East Europe MAX 2007
|Dnipropetrovsk, Ukraine
|Extra round decision
|align="center"|4
|align="center"|3:00
|2007 Lithuania Grand Prix quarter-final.
|-
|
|Win
| Artem Sheglov
|K-1 MAX Ukraine 2006
|Dnipropetrovsk, Ukraine
|Decision
|align="center"|3
|align="center"|3:00
|2006 Ukraine Grand Prix final.
|-
|
|Win
| Oleksandr Medvedev
|K-1 MAX Ukraine 2006
|Dnipropetrovsk, Ukraine
|Decision
|align="center"|3
|align="center"|3:00
|2006 Ukraine Grand Prix semi-final.
|-
|
|Win
| Dmitry Konstantinov
|K-1 MAX Ukraine 2006
|Dnipropetrovsk, Ukraine
|Decision
|align="center"|3
|align="center"|3:00
|2006 Ukraine Grand Prix quarter-final.
|-
|
|Win
| Vasily Shish
|K-1 East Europe MAX 2006
|Vilnius, Lithuania
|Extra round decision (majority)
|align="center"|4
|align="center"|3:00
| 
|-
|
|Loss
| Artem Levin
|WMF World Muaythai Championships finals
|Bangkok, Thailand
| -
|align="center"|-
|align="center"|-
|For WMC IFMA World Muay Thai Championships 75 kg gold medal.
|-
|
|Loss
| Vasily Shish
|Belarus vs Australia
|Bilohirsk, Ukraine
|Decision
|align="center"|5
|align="center"|3:00
| 
|-
|-
| colspan=9 | Legend:

See also 
K-1
List of K-1 events
List of male kickboxers

References

1982 births
Living people
Ukrainian male kickboxers
Welterweight kickboxers
Middleweight kickboxers
Ukrainian Muay Thai practitioners
Sportspeople from Odesa